2,3-Bisphosphoglyceric acid (conjugate base 2,3-bisphosphoglycerate) (2,3-BPG), also known as 2,3-diphosphoglyceric acid (conjugate base 2,3-diphosphoglycerate) (2,3-DPG), is a three-carbon isomer of the glycolytic intermediate 1,3-bisphosphoglyceric acid (1,3-BPG).

-2,3-BPG is present in human red blood cells (RBC; erythrocyte) at approximately 5 mmol/L. It binds with greater affinity to deoxygenated hemoglobin (e.g., when the red blood cell is near respiring tissue) than it does to oxygenated hemoglobin (e.g., in the lungs) due to conformational differences: 2,3-BPG (with an estimated size of about 9 Å) fits in the deoxygenated hemoglobin conformation (with an 11-Angstrom pocket), but not as well in the oxygenated conformation (5 Angstroms). It interacts with deoxygenated hemoglobin beta subunits and decreases the affinity for oxygen and allosterically promotes the release of the remaining oxygen molecules bound to the hemoglobin. Therefore, it enhances the ability of RBCs to release oxygen near tissues that need it most. 2,3-BPG is thus an allosteric effector.

Its function was discovered in 1967 by Reinhold Benesch and Ruth Benesch.

Metabolism

2,3-BPG is formed from 1,3-BPG by the enzyme BPG mutase. It can then be broken down by 2,3-BPG phosphatase to form 3-phosphoglycerate. Its synthesis and breakdown are, therefore, a way around a step of glycolysis, with the net expense of one ATP per molecule of 2,3-BPG generated as the high-energy carboxylic acid-phosphate mixed anhydride bond is cleaved by bisphosphoglycerate mutase.

The normal glycolytic pathway generates 1,3-BPG, which may be dephosphorylated by phosphoglycerate kinase (PGK), generating ATP, or it may be shunted into the Luebering-Rapoport pathway, where bisphosphoglycerate mutase catalyzes the transfer of a phosphoryl group from C1 to C2 of 1,3-BPG, giving 2,3-BPG. 2,3-BPG, the most concentrated organophosphate in the erythrocyte, forms 3-PG by the action of bisphosphoglycerate phosphatase. The concentration of 2,3-BPG varies proportionately to the [H+].

There is a delicate balance between the need to generate ATP to support energy requirements for cell metabolism and the need to maintain appropriate oxygenation/deoxygenation status of hemoglobin. This balance is maintained by isomerisation of 1,3-BPG to 2,3-BPG, which enhances the deoxygenation of hemoglobin.

Effects of binding

When 2,3-BPG binds to deoxyhemoglobin, it acts to stabilize the low oxygen affinity state (T state) of the oxygen carrier. It fits neatly into the cavity of the deoxy- conformation, exploiting the molecular symmetry and positive polarity by forming salt bridges with lysine and histidine residues in the ß subunits of hemoglobin. The R state, with oxygen bound to a heme group, has a different conformation and does not allow this interaction.

By itself, hemoglobin has sigmoid-like kinetics. In selectively binding to deoxyhemoglobin, 2,3-BPG stabilizes the T state conformation, making it harder for oxygen to bind hemoglobin and more likely to be released to adjacent tissues.  2,3-BPG is part of a feedback loop that can help prevent tissue hypoxia in conditions where it is most likely to occur. Conditions of low tissue oxygen concentration such as high altitude (2,3-BPG levels are higher in those acclimated to high altitudes), airway obstruction, or congestive heart failure will tend to cause RBCs to generate more 2,3-BPG, because changes in pH and oxygen modulate the enzymes that make and degrade it. The accumulation of 2,3-BPG decreases the affinity of hemoglobin for oxygen. Ultimately, this mechanism increases oxygen release from RBCs under circumstances where it is needed most. This release is potentiated by the Bohr effect, in which hemoglobin's binding affinity for oxygen is also reduced by a lower pH and high concentration of carbon dioxide. In tissues with high energetic demands, oxygen is rapidly consumed, which increases the concentration of H+ and carbon dioxide. Through the Bohr effect, hemoglobin is induced to release more oxygen to supply cells that need it.  In contrast, 2,3-BPG has no effect on the related compound myoglobin.(reference required)

In pregnant women, there is a 30% increase in intracellular 2,3-BPG. This lowers the maternal hemoglobin affinity for oxygen, and therefore allows more oxygen to be offloaded to the fetus in the maternal uterine arteries. The fetus has a low sensitivity to 2,3-BPG, so its hemoglobin has a higher affinity for oxygen. Therefore, although the pO2 in the uterine arteries is low, the fetal umbilical artery (which carries deoxygenated blood) can still get oxygenated from them.

Fetal hemoglobin
Fetal hemoglobin (HbF) exhibits a low affinity for 2,3-BPG, resulting in a higher binding affinity for oxygen.  This increased oxygen-binding affinity relative to that of adult hemoglobin (HbA) is due to HbF's having two α/γ dimers as opposed to the two α/β dimers of HbA.  The positive histidine residues of HbA β-subunits that are essential for forming the 2,3-BPG binding pocket are replaced by serine residues in HbF γ-subunits. Like that, histidine nº143 gets lost, so 2,3-BPG has difficulties in linking to the fetal hemoglobin, and it looks like the pure hemoglobin.
Increased binding affinity of fetal hemoglobin relative to HbA facilitates the passage of oxygen across the placental membrane from the mother to the fetus.

Differences between myoglobin (Mb), fetal hemoglobin (Hb F), adult hemoglobin (Hb A)

Diseases related to 2,3-BPG
Hyperthyroidism

A 2004 study checked the effects of thyroid hormone on 2,3-BPG levels. The result was that the hyperthyroidism modulates in vivo 2,3-BPG content in erythrocytes by changes in the expression of phosphoglycerate mutase (PGM) and 2,3-BPG synthase.
This result shows that the increase in the 2,3-BPG content of erythrocytes observed in hyperthyroidism doesn’t depend on any variation in the rate of circulating hemoglobin, but seems to be a direct consequence of the stimulating effect of thyroid hormones on erythrocyte glycolytic activity.

Chronic anemia

Red cells increase their intracellular 2,3-BPG concentration as much as five times within one to two hours in patients with chronic anemia, when the oxygen carrying capacity of the blood is diminished. This results in a rightward shift of the oxygen dissociation curve and more oxygen being released to the tissues.

Chronic respiratory disease with hypoxia

Recently, scientists have found similarities between low amounts of 2,3-BPG with the occurrence of high altitude pulmonary edema at high altitudes.

Hemodialysis
In a 1998 study, erythrocyte 2,3-BPG concentration was analyzed during the hemodialysis process. The 2,3-BPG concentration was expressed relative to the hemoglobin tetramer (Hb4) concentration as the 2,3-BPG/Hb4 ratio. Physiologically, an increase in 2,3-BPG levels would be expected to counteract the hypoxia that is frequently observed in this process. Nevertheless, the results show a 2,3-BPG/Hb4 ratio decreased. This is due to the procedure itself: mechanical stress on the erythrocytes is believed to cause the 2,3-BPG escape, which is then removed by hemodialysis. The concentrations of calcium, phosphate, creatinine, urea and albumin did not correlate significantly with the total change in 2,3-BPG/Hb4 ratio. However, the ratio sampled just before dialysis correlated significantly and positively with the total weekly dosage of erythropoietin (main hormone in erythrocyte formation) given to the patients.

See also 
 Oxygen–hemoglobin dissociation curve
 Inhibiting transformation of primary calciprotein particles into secondary calciprotein particles

References

 Berg, J.M., Tymockzko, J.L. and Stryer L. Biochemistry.  (5th ed.). W.H. Freeman and Co, New York, 1995. .
 
Online medical dictionary
Nelson, David L.; Cox, Michael M.; Lehninger, Albert L. Principles of Biochemistry. (4th ed.). W.H. Freeman, 2005. .
Müller-Esterl, W. Biochemistry: Fundamentals of Medicine and the Science of Life. (2nd ed.). Reverté, 2008. .
Rodak. Hematology: Clinical Principles and Applications (2nd ed.). Elsevier Science, Philadelphia, 2003. .
González-Cinca N, Pérez de la Ossa P, Carreras J, Climent F. "Effects of thyroid hormone and hypoxia on 2,3-bisphosphoglycerate, bisphosphoglycerate synthase and phosphoglycerate mutase in rabbit erythroblasts and reticulocytes in vivo". Unitat de Bioquímica, Departament de Ciéncies Fisiològiques I, Institut d'Investigacions Biomèdiques August Pi i Sunyer, Universitat de Barcelona, Barcelona, Spain, 2004.
Nielsen AL, Andersen EM, Jørgensen LG, Jensen HA. "Oxygen and 2,3 biphosphoglycerate (2,3-BPG) during haemodialysis". Department of Nephrology, Hvidovre University Hospital, Denmark, 1998.
"Anales de la Real Academia Nacional de Medicina (cuaderno cuarto)".

External links
A live model of the effect of changing 2,3 BPG on the oxyhaemoglobin saturation curve

Organophosphates
Respiratory physiology